Dolany is a municipality and village in Plzeň-North District in the Plzeň Region of the Czech Republic. It has about 300 inhabitants.

Administrative parts
The village of Habrová is an administrative part of Dolany.

References

Villages in Plzeň-North District